Hinton Parva is a hamlet former civil parish, now in the civil parish of Hinton, in east Dorset, England, three miles north of Wimborne Minster. The parish had a population of 56 in 2001. The settlement includes the nearby village of Stanbridge. The civil parish was abolished on 1 April 2015 and merged with Hinton Martell to form Hinton.

References

External links

 Census data

Hamlets in Dorset
Former civil parishes in Dorset
East Dorset District